The Treaty of The Hague (also known as the Treaty of Den Haag) was signed on 6 August 1661 between representatives of the Dutch Empire and the Portuguese Empire. Based on the terms of the treaty, the Dutch Republic recognized Portuguese imperial sovereignty over New Holland (Dutch Brazil) in exchange for an indemnity of 4 million reis, conversion from 2 million caroli guilders, over the span of 16 years.

History 
In 1648-49 the Luso-Brazilians defeated the Dutch in the first and second battles of Guararapes, and gradually eliminated the Dutch presence in their colonies of Brazil and Angola. In addition, the wars between England and the Dutch Republic were weakening Dutch power everywhere. In January 1654 the Dutch surrendered and signed the Treaty of Taborda, but only as a provisory pact (truce). 

With the end of the First Anglo-Dutch War, the Dutch Republic began, in May 1654, to demand New Holland (Dutch Brazil) back. The Grand Pensionary of Holland Johan de Witt did not agree with these strong-arm tactics because he thought that commerce was more important than the possession of territories. Therefore, a peace treaty was signed on 6 August 1661 at The Hague whereby New Holland was sold to Portugal for the equivalent of 63 tonnes of gold (roughly $4 billion in 2023). The treaty later led to a deal over Dutch Java and Portugal's East Timor. The Dutch promised not to enter or claim Timor for the Treaty of The Hague stated none of these powers would declare war on each other or claim or enter their territory or colonies.

References

Bibliography
 Cabral de Mello, Evaldo, O Negócio do Brasil - Portugal, os Países Baixos e o Nordeste 1641-1669. Rio de Janeiro: Topbooks, 1998.

See also
List of treaties

External links
 Portugal History 
 The purchase of northeast Brazil 

Colonial Brazil
The Hague (1661)
The Hague (1661)
1661 treaties
Treaties of the Dutch Republic
The Hague
Portuguese colonization of the Americas
1661 in the Dutch Republic
1661 in Portugal
17th century in The Hague
Dutch Republic–Portugal relations